Pablo Jáquez Isunza  (born 29 September 1995) a Mexican professional footballer who plays as a defender for Pumas Tabasco on loan from UNAM.

Honours
Mexico U20
CONCACAF U-20 Championship: 2015

External links
 

Living people
1995 births
Mexican footballers
Association football defenders
Club Universidad Nacional footballers
Dorados de Sinaloa footballers
Liga MX players
Ascenso MX players
Liga Premier de México players
Tercera División de México players
2015 CONCACAF U-20 Championship players
Mexico under-20 international footballers
Footballers from Mexico City